Pochazia shantungensis is a species of planthopper in the family Ricaniidae. Another scientific name for it is Ricania shantungensis, more commonly known as the brown winged cicada This species is considered an agricultural and forestry pest (M.A. Rahman et al., 2012). It is mainly found along the roadsides in the Zhejiang Province. Also found in orchards in the Shantung province.  It has recently been classified as an invasive species within western parts of Korean and Turkey.

Characteristics
The body length of P. shantungensis can vary depending on gender. Males typically exhibit a body length from vertex to tip of genitalia of 7.5 - 7.8 mm. They also exhibit a 14.0 - 14.4 mm body length from vertex to the tip of the forewings. Females are bigger and exhibit a body length from vertex to tip of genitalia of 8.3 - 8.8 mm. From the vertex to the tip of the forewings is 15.0 - 15.3 mm. The coloration of these insects range from dark brown to black. Their vertex, frons, clypeus, rostrum, and eyes are often brown to dark brown. The pronotum and mesonotum are black along with the thorax. The forewings are dark brown but have an elliptical white spot around the costal margin. It is roughly two-thirds from the base. The posterior margin of the abdomen segments are yellow.

These planthoppers lay their eggs in a zigzag pattern. They are then covered with white wax filaments. These eggs are often found within trees regardless of height or direction of the branch.

Geographical range
Commonly found within the Zhejiang Province in China. It is also commonly found within the Shandong province of China, in the eastern coastal regions. However, they are only listed as a pest within Zhejiang Province. This species has been reported as an invasive species in the coastal areas of Southern Korea starting in 2010. These areas are similar in annual temperature and precipitation.

First detected in European Turkey and Southern France in 2018, and was later detected across the Bosphorus on the Asian side of Istanbul.

Habitat
P.  shantungensis can live in various types of landscapes such as cities, orchards, agricultural fields, and forests. Pochazia  shantungensis is found to favor higher density in mountain regions and valleys.

Invasive species
The species has recently been labeled as an invasive species as it has moved from its usual habitat in China to locations such as Turkey and Korea. Some common hosts are apple, blueberry, Korean black raspberry, Schisandra chinensis, lacquer tree, Aralia elata, jujube, apple, Cedrela sinensis, chestnut, magnolia, quince, plum and acacia. Other common hosts in Korea: Malus pumila, Diospyros kaki, Zelkova serrata,  Aralia elata, Styrax japonicus, Salix gracilistyla, Broussonetia kazinoki, Albizia julibrissin, Ailanthus altissima, Chaenomeles sinensis, Rubus crataegifolius, Castanea crenata, and Robinia pseudoacacia.

In the Kurye, Jeonnam area the damage occurred on fruit trees, such as Cornus, persimmon, and chestnut. It seems to mainly affect fruit bearing trees/bushes. In an experiment studying the outbreak, the species preferred Cornus officinalis, Diospyros kaki, Castanea crenata, Eucommia ulmoides, and Styrax japonicus to lay their eggs. The eggs were laid on the inner twigs of the trees and each egg-mass had an average of 28 eggs. This is one of the ways that Pochazia can damage the trees. The eggs suck the nutrients out of the trees and cause a sooty mold.

Damage
Pochazia  shantungensis has been classified as an invasive species because it has been affecting agricultural farms. The species causes damage to common agricultural plants such as apples and blueberries. As mentioned previously, it causes damage by sucking the nutrients out of the trees that it lays its egg. This indirectly causes the sooty mold disease found commonly on these plants. These eggs hatch around mid may to early June with the spawning season occurring in mid August.

Control/mitigation
Mitigation depends on how the farm/region wants to pursue the process of removing this species. One study found that there are environmentally friendly materials that can be used to control both the nymph and adult Ricana with a mortality rate of above 80%. The use of sophora and natural plant extracts can help alleviate this problem.

Another mitigation solution involves using yellow-colored sticky traps. The sticky trap made it possible to safely remove the eggs during spawning season. The traps should be placed around common locations for oviposition depending on the farm and plant. It also deters the Ricania shantungensis from laying eggs there again, as the eggs don't survive.

References

External links
 
 

Ricaniidae